Alexander Aronovich Knaifel (also Knayfel, Knayfel, or Kneifel; born 28 November 1943 in Tashkent, Uzbekistan) is a Russian composer known for his operas The Ghost of Canterville and Alice in Wonderland as well as for his music for cinema.

Education
Knaifel studied cello with Mstislav Rostropovich at Moscow Conservatory from 1961 to 1963, then composition with Boris Arapov in Leningrad from 1964 until 1967.

Music
From the very beginning of his composing career he associated himself with the group of so to say "avant-garde" Soviet composers that include Andrey Volkonsky, Edison Denisov, Alfred Schnittke, Sofia Gubaidulina, Valentin Silvestrov, Leonid Hrabovsky, Arvo Pärt, Tigran Mansuryan, and others. The works of the 1990s and 2000s were strongly influenced by religious themes and showed dramatic changes of his musical language.

He wrote more than 80 compositions in various genres and also more than 40 scores for features films and documentaries.

His music often surprises by its extravagant ideas, strange combination of the instruments or incredibly long duration. For example, his very slow and quiet Agnus Dei (1985) written for four instrumentalists (each of them plays several instruments including keyboards, percussion, electronics, saxophones and double bass) lasts exactly 120 minutes. Another two hours long piece Nika (72 fragments after Heraclitus and Dante 1973–1974), is written for 17 double basses; and the piece titled Solaris (1980) is scored for 35 Javanese gongs.

In 1979 Knaifel was blacklisted as one of the "Khrennikov's Seven" at the Sixth Congress of the Union of Soviet Composers for unapproved participation in some festivals of Soviet music in the West.

Norman Lebrecht explains Knaifel and his music as follows: "Russian iconoclast, writing slow, quiet and unsettling music that passes from one instrument to another when it is good and ready... Many of his scores are unperformed, perhaps unperformable."

Alexander Knaifel had a performance dedicated to his music in Ireland on 1 May 2009 as part of the Drogheda Arts Festival. The event entitled The Rest is Noise : the music of Alexander Knaifel featured the world premiere of a new work To EF and the three calling cards of the poet.

Selected works
The Ghost of Canterville, opera in 3 acts with Prologue after Oscar Wilde for soloists and chamber orchestra (1965–1966)
Medea, ballet in two parts after the Greek saga (1968)
Monody for female voice (1968)
The Silly Horse, 15 poems after V. Levin and F. Solasko for female singer and piano (1981) CD Megadisc MDC 7844: Tatjana Melentieva (soprano), Oleg Malov (piano)
Agnus Dei for four instruments a cappella (1985) CD Megadisc 7808/07: Ensemble Musiques Nouvelles
God, ode after Dershavin for chorus and children's chorus (1985)
Litany I for orchestra (1988)
Litany II for orchestra (1988)
Through the Rainbow of Unvoluntary Tears for soprano and cello (1988)
The Offer for a chorus of string instruments (1991)
Svete Tikhiy (O Gladsome Light), song of the Most Holy Theotokos for Tatjana Melentieva (1991) CD ECM New Series 1763: Tatiana Melentieva (soprano), Andrei Siegle (sampler)
Yet again on the Hypothesis (A Dialogue with J.S. Bach Prelude and Fugue B minor from Well Tempered Piano) for soloistic instrumental ensemble (1991–1992)
In any Forgetting of Exhaustion, postludium to the memory of M.G. Orlovski for chamber orchestra (1992)
Postludium for soprano and piano) CD Megadisc MDC 7855: Tatjana Melentieva (soprano), Oleg Malov (piano)
The Jacob's Ladder, glossolalia of Thirteen for chorus (1992)
The Eighth Chapter, canticum canticorum for choruses and cello (1993)
In Air Clear and Unseen, stanzas with Tyutchev for piano and string quartet (1994) CD ECM New Series 1763: Keller Quartet, Oleg Malov (piano)
Lux Aeterna for two cellos and psalm singers (1998)
Scarry March for soprano and piano CD Megadisc MDC 7855: Tatjana Melentieva (soprano), Oleg Malov (piano)
Prayer to the Holy Spirit for soprano and piano CD Megadisc MDC 7855: Tatjana Melentieva (soprano), Oleg Malov (piano)
Alice in Wonderland, opera (2001)
EF and the Three Calling Cards of the Poet, string trio: Joachim Roewer, Elizabeth Cooney and Elizabeth Wilson world premiere in Ireland (2009)
O Heavenly King, the first recording of the version for string quartet, piano/celeste and soprano features on the Louth Contemporary Music CD A Place Between (2009)

Notes

References
Svetlana Savenko: The magic of Alexander Knaifel’s message; also: List of Alexander Knaifel’s principal works. In "Ex oriente...III" Eight Composers from the former USSR Philip Gershkovich, Boris Tishchenko, Leonid Grabovsky, Alexander Knaifel, Vladislav Shoot, Alexander Vustin, Alexander Raskatov, Sergei Pavlenko. Edited by Valeria Tsenova. English edition only (studia slavica musicologica, Bd. 31). Verlag Ernst Kuhn – Berlin ;

Tara Wilson: 'Russian Post-Minimalist Music: A Semiological Investigation into the Narrative Approaches employed by Alexander Knaifel between 1978 and 1994' (PhD Thesis: Goldsmiths, University of London, 2015).

External links
ECM Biography
Alexander Knaifel : A Composer Documentary Trailer by Jorge Rubiera

Living people
1943 births
Russian opera composers
Male opera composers
Russian male classical composers
Soviet film score composers
Male film score composers
Musicians from Tashkent
21st-century classical composers
20th-century classical composers
Moscow Conservatory alumni
Russian Jews
Jewish classical composers
20th-century Russian male musicians
21st-century Russian male musicians